Tularosa is a village in Otero County, New Mexico. It shares its name with the Tularosa Basin, in which the town is located. To the east, Tularosa is flanked by the western edge of the Sacramento Mountains. The population was 2,842 at the 2010 census. During the 1990s and early 2000s, the town, north of the much larger Alamogordo, experienced moderate growth and construction as a bedroom community, especially in the housing industry. Tularosa is noted for its abundance of cottonwood shade trees and its efforts to preserve the adobe-style architecture of its past.

History

Tularosa gets its name from the Spanish description for the red or rose colored reeds growing along the banks of the Rio Tularosa. The Rio Tularosa, which still exists along the north side of the village, attracted the original settlers as a water source in the desert. Settlers attempted to establish a settlement in 1860 but were unsuccessful due to Mescalero Apache raids. Two years later, after a battle at nearby Round Mountain, Hispanic farmers from the Rio Grande valley succeeded in settling the area. The Mission Church, St Francis de Paula was built to honor a promise made to St Francis that if no one was killed in the battle at Round Mountain, the townspeople would build a church dedicated to him. In 1863, the Town of Tularosa was formally established and was mapped with 49 blocks and water rights distributed and recorded.

The original acequia (ditch irrigation system) remains virtually unchanged and provides the water for the trees lining the streets, private gardens, and landscaping that give Tularosa its unique character.

In 1979, the Tularosa Original Townsite District, consisting of the original 49 blocks on  including 182 buildings, was declared a historic district and recorded in the National Register of Historic Places.

In 2008 Tularosa became an affiliate of Keep America Beautiful. The local branch of the program, Keep Tularosa Beautiful, received a grant in 2008 of $10,000 for beautification projects from Waste Management.

Geography
Tularosa is located at  (33.076282, -106.021699).

At the northern side of town is the Tularosa Creek which flows out of Tularosa Canyon, descending from the Mescalero Apache Indian Reservation, and which separates the Sacramento Mountains to the south from the Sierra Blancas to the north. The Coyote Hills are to the north-east of town, foothills of the Sacramentos.

Demographics

As of the census of 2000, there were 2,864 people, 1,134 households, and 765 families residing in the village. The racial makeup of the village was 68.61% White, 0.87% African American, 4.26% Native American, 0.66% Asian, 0.03% Pacific Islander, 21.51% from other races, and 4.05% from two or more races. Hispanic or Latino of any race were 56.08% of the population.

There were 1,134 households, out of which 31.0% had children under the age of 18 living with them, 48.2% were married couples living together, 14.9% had a female householder with no husband present, and 32.5% were non-families. 28.4% of all households were made up of individuals, and 12.6% had someone living alone who was 65 years of age or older. The average household size was 2.53 and the average family size was 3.09.

The population was spread out, with 27.4% under the age of 18, 7.3% from 18 to 24, 24.9% from 25 to 44, 24.0% from 45 to 64, and 16.4% who were 65 years of age or older. The median age was 39 years. For every 100 females, there were 92.3 males. For every 100 females age 18 and over, there were 91.4 males.

The median income for a household was $27,522, and the median income for a family was $30,313. Males had a median income of $23,654 versus $18,080 for females. The per capita income in Tularosa was $12,507. About 19.5% of families and 21.4% of the population were below the poverty line, including 29.7% of those under age 18 and 17.0% of those age 65 or over.

Festivals and events

The Rose Festival is held annually, usually in the first weekend of May. There is an old-timer's picnic, a Rose Queen, arts and crafts - all celebrating the abundance of blossoming flowers. Other celebrations are the Fiesta of St. Francis de Paula. 

Luminarias line the church plaza and the highway on Christmas Eve, giving a soft glow of welcome to those driving through on U. S. Highways 70 and 54.
The luminaria display on Christmas Eve is perhaps Tularosa, New Mexico’s best-known treasure. This one-night-only display of light, love and tradition is one of the best parts of the holiday season in the Tularosa Basin. 

Thousands of luminarias are displayed throughout the Village on Christmas Eve. A luminaria, in case you just moved here from Ohio or another country altogether, is a candle carefully set in sand inside of a paper bag and lit to create a warm glow at night.  

There are sometimes conflicting opinions about the correct use of the term “luminaria”. Most of us refer to the paper bag lantern in this way, but traditionalists insist the correct term is 'farolitos'. Historically, a true luminaria is a series of small bonfires lining the road. According to tripsavvy.com, luminarias have their roots in the 1800s. Originally, small bonfires were used to guide people to Christmas mass. Often, they are associated with the final night of Las Posadas, which is the symbolic representation of when Mary and Joseph were seeking shelter in Bethlehem, walking from home to home for a place to rest.  

For about 20 years, most of the luminarias displayed in Tularosa were supplied through a cooperative effort between the Tularosa Chamber of Commerce and the Village of Tularosa.

Points of interest

The Tularosa Original Townsite District is a listing on the National Register of Historic Places. It includes Saint Francis de Paula church.

Transportation
The two major highways are U.S. Route 54 and U.S. Route 70. From the south, both highways are merged as they come into town, but the highways diverge toward the north end of town with Route 54 continuing north, and Route 70 heading east.

In the early 1900s the El Paso and Southwestern Railroad build a railroad line down from the coal mines at Dawson, New Mexico through Tucumcari and Carrizozo to Tularosa and continuing to El Paso. In 1924, that line later became part of the Southern Pacific Railroad, which merged with Union Pacific Railroad in 1996.

There is a privately owned airstrip at Beckett Farm in Tularosa. The nearest commercial airports are the Sierra Blanca Regional Airport and the Alamogordo-White Sands Regional Airport.

Education
Tularosa Public Schools is part of the Tularosa Municipal Schools School District. The school district has two elementary schools, one middle school and one high school. In Tularosa are Tularosa Elementary School, Tularosa Middle School and Tularosa High School.

Brenda Vigil is the Superintendent of Schools.

Notable people
 Jan Clayton, film and stage actress
 Dianna Duran, former New Mexico Secretary of State
 Steve Ontiveros, MLB pitcher
 Katherine D. Ortega, 38th Treasurer of the United States
 Gary Paulsen, author
 Ace Powell, painter and sculptor
 Tammie Jo Shults, pilot who safely landed Southwest Airlines Flight 1380
 Kim Stanley, film and stage actress

In popular culture
Bob Dylan mentions Tularosa in his song “Billy #4”. The verse is “Gypsy queens will play your grande finale, way down in some Tularosa alley.”

Tularosa has been the setting for a number of Western novels, including:
 Tularosa by Michael McGarrity
 Lucky In Love by Stacey Coverstone
 West of the Tularosa: A Trio by Louis L'Amour
 Hard Country by Michael McGarrity
 It is also the subject and name of a song by Paul Young entitled "Tularosa" on the album "Paul Young" (1997).
 Some footage from the 2009 movie Transformers: Revenge of the Fallen was shot in and around Tularosa.

USS Tularosa

The village had a United States Navy Mettawee-class gasoline tanker named after it. The USS Tularosa (AOG-430) was built by East Coast Shipyards, Inc. and launched on 17 December 1944; sponsored by Miss Patricia Hefferman; acquired by the Navy on 4 January 1945 and commissioned at the New York Navy Yard on 10 January 1945. It saw World War II service before being decommissioned on 23 April 1946.

References

Further reading
 Sonnichsen, C. L. (1960) Tularosa-Last Of The Frontier West

External links

 

Tularosa Basin
Villages in Otero County, New Mexico
Villages in New Mexico
Populated places established in 1863